Porphine or porphin is an organic chemical compound with formula .  The molecule, which is flat, consists of four pyrrole-like rings joined by four methine (=CH−) groups to form a larger macrocycle ring, which makes it the simplest of the tetrapyrroles. It is classified as an aromatic and heterocyclic compound.

Porphine is only of theoretical interest. It has been detected in GC-MS of certain fractions of Piper betle.

Porphine derivatives: porphyrins 
Substituted derivatives of porphine are called porphyrins.  Many porphyrins are found in nature with the dominant example being protoporphyrin IX.  Many synthetic porphyrins are also known, including octaethylporphyrin and tetraphenylporphyrin.

Further reading

References 

Biomolecules
Chelating agents
Macrocycles
Tetrapyrroles